The National Socialism Association (NSA) is a far-right political organization in Taiwan, founded in August 2005 by participants of the online forum Taiwan Nazi. It received international attention in March 2007, following reports of its inaugural in-person meeting that month.

Despite its use of Nazi iconography and praise of Nazi leader Adolf Hitler, the NSA claims that it is not a neo-Nazi organization. The group's activities and practices have been condemned by a number of prominent Jewish organizations and individuals. Several domestic and international political commentators have also criticized the NSA's leadership for their lack of knowledge regarding the Holocaust and Nazism in general.

History 
NSA chair Joshua Yue Shu-ya stated that the organization was founded some time in August 2005 by participants of the online forum Taiwan Nazi. The forum was later transformed into the NSA's website.

The NSA was registered as a public organization under Taiwanese law in September 2006. Its registerers were two political science graduates: Hsu Na-chi, at the time a 22-year-old who had recently completed her bachelor's at Soochow University; and Lahn Chao Wei, a 24-year-old postgraduate who was pursuing his master's degree in political science at National Chengchi University. The registration was met with backlash both domestically and abroad, with critics calling for the registration's reversal. The Taiwanese government, however, responded that the establishment and existence of the NSA were protected by the country's constitution, which guarantees freedom of speech and organization.

In an interview with Apple Daily on 10 March 2007, Hsu claimed that she started researching Nazism during her undergraduate years. She argued that the constant political struggle between the Kuomintang and the Democratic Progressive Party had hampered Taiwan's ability to nation-build, and so the establishment of a fascist state was needed to end the conflict and bring stability.

Chao meanwhile wrote a public statement on the NSA's website on 13 March 2007, saying that he was not a racist or a neo-Nazi, but he nonetheless "identifies with Nazi ideology". The Taipei Times reported that Chao regularly posted photos of himself in Nazi cosplay on the NSA's website while it was still online.

Alongside Chao's statement was an announcement by Hsu, who indicated her intention to register the NSA as a non-governmental organization. The group was unable to do so as it did not have enough adult members. In this regard, Chao commented, "We have too many high school and middle school students and not enough adults."

The NSA's inaugural in-person meeting was held on 17 March 2007 in Taichung. It was reportedly attended by ten people. A day after the meeting, on 18 March, the NSA issued a public apology, saying, "[We] condemn violence and illegality; Hitler is not the foundation of our ideology." Taiwan's Ministry of Foreign Affairs responded by saying that the NSA had already damaged Taiwan's reputation abroad.

Membership 
The NSA had 20 dues-paying members in March 2007. Its website, which functioned primarily as an online forum, had more than 760 registered accounts prior to its exposure in major media; the NSA claimed that the number rose to over 1,400 afterwards.

Taiwanese nationalist politician Yang Chih-yuan registered an account on the forum in late 2006, when he was a middle school student.

Practices 
NSA members greet each other with the Nazi salute and repeat the slogans "One People, One Country, One Leader" (a reference to the Nazi slogan "") and "Long live Hitler" during meetings.

Criticisms 
Various prominent Jewish organizations and individuals around the world have condemned the NSA's activities and practices. The Simon Wiesenthal Center condemned the NSA on 13 March 2007 for championing Hitler and blaming democracy for Taiwan's "social unrest". Raphael Gamzou, Israel's representative in Taiwan at the time, described the group as "ignorant and stupid".

Chao responded to accusations of racism and antisemitism by asserting that the NSA merely aimed to "develop Taiwan's strength, foster national unity, and restore traditional Chinese values like Confucianism". Chao stated that the group was rooted in the ideas of Sun Yat-sen, not Adolf Hitler. The German public broadcaster Deutsche Welle pushed back against Chao's assertions of moderateness, saying: "On the surface, [the NSA] only said that Taiwan should be strong. On the surface, it does not engage in racism or antisemitism. But in fact, these ideas exist [within the group]. It is very dangerous to choose this political path."

Yue similarly claimed that the NSA had "nothing to do with Nazism" and its members wanted to "study Hitler's good points, not his massacres". However, the Taipei Times noted that Yue had made several posts on the NSA's website which were reminiscent of Nazi rhetoric. For example, Yue advocated harsher immigration restrictions, the criminalization of interracial marriage, and the killing of infants born to migrant workers. Emile Sheng, a municipal official in Taipei, commented on the NSA's backtracking, saying: "People here do not really understand what Nazism is. They are not really racist or antisemitic. They do not even know what [Nazism] means."

Notes

References 

Fascism in Taiwan
Neo-Nazism in Asia
Neo-Nazi organizations
Political organizations established in 2005
Political organizations based in Taiwan